The Slant-Six is the popular name for a Chrysler inline-6 internal combustion engine with an overhead valve reverse-flow cylinder head and cylinder bank inclined at a 30-degree angle from vertical. Introduced in 1959, it was known within Chrysler as the G-engine. It was a direct replacement for the flathead Chrysler straight six that the company started business with in 1925 until the old design was discontinued in the 1960s.

Design
The Chrysler Slant Six engine was a clean-sheet design, led by Willem Weertman, later Chrysler's chief engine designer. Its characteristic 30° inclination of cylinder block gives it a lower height overall engine package. This 30° inclination had already been used by Mercedes-Benz in their 300SL sports car with the M186 engine since 1952. This enabled vehicle stylists to lower hoodlines, and also made room for the water pump to be mounted with a lateral offset, significantly shortening the engine's overall length. The slanted cylinder block also provides space in the vehicle's engine bay for intake and exhaust manifolds with runners of longer and more nearly equal length compared to the rake- or log-style manifolds typical of other inline engines. The No. 1 and No. 6 intake runners are of approximately equal length, the No. 2 and No. 5 equal but shorter, and the No. 3 and No. 4 equal and shortest. This has the effect of broadening the torque curve for better performance. The Slant Six manifold configuration gives relatively even distribution of fuel mixture to all cylinders, and presents less flow restriction. This, in turn, provides for relatively good airflow through the engine despite the intake and exhaust ports being on the same side of the head rather than in a crossflow arrangement.

It was introduced in two piston displacement sizes in 1960: The  "LG" (low-G, referring to the relatively short engine block casting and crankshaft stroke) in the Valiant, and the  "RG" (raised-G, referring to the relatively tall engine block casting and crankshaft stroke) in full-size Plymouth and Dodge Dart models. In 1960, the engine was called the "30-D Economy Six" engine by Plymouth marketers, referring to the 30° cylinder block angle.

The G-engine was offered in various configurations in the North American market until 1983 in cars, 1987 in trucks, and 1991 for marine, agricultural, and industrial use. Replacement engines were built in Mexico through 2000. The G-engine was used by Chrysler's international operations in locally produced vehicles. It was also purchased by other original equipment manufacturers for installation in commercial vehicles, agricultural and industrial equipment, and boats.

The G-engine gained a reputation for reliability and durability. The basic design is rigid and sturdy, in part because the engine was designed to be made of either iron or aluminum. An aluminum block was produced in 1961–1963, but most blocks were made of iron. The block is of a deep-skirt design, with the crankshaft axis well above the oil pan rails for structural rigidity. Although only four main bearings are used, they are of the same dimensions as those in the 2G (1964–1971) Hemi, and fewer mains results in a crankshaft better able to withstand the effects of torque. Efficient cooling and lubrication systems, a favorable ratio of connecting rod length to stroke, and a forged steel crankshaft (on engines made through mid-1976) all contributed to the engine's strength and durability.

The G-engine gave better performance than its competitors at its 1960 introduction, and generally kept up through the 1960s and early-1970s, though engines like the Pontiac OHC Six, a brief GM outlier,  bested the performance of most versions of the Slant-6. After an early factory racing program was discontinued by 1962, the Slant Six did not receive much performance development. Most Slant Sixes were equipped with a single 1-barrel carburetor. Starting in the early 1970s, primitive emission controls adversely affected driveability and power, though a version of the 2-barrel carburetor package first released for marine and export markets in 1967 was offered in North America from 1977 to 1983 under the "Super Six" name. Performance figures were only slightly higher, but driveability was substantially improved.

Other Chrysler engines were released with more advanced combustion chambers, electronic fuel injection, and other modern improvements, but the length of the Slant Six precluded its use in Chrysler's front-wheel-drive cars. A new  V6 engine was created for the 1987 Dodge Dakota compact pickup truck by removing two cylinders from the corporate  LA V8 engine. It replaced the Slant-6 in the rest of the Dodge truck line at the end of the 1987 model year.

Significant production changes
 The combustion chamber shape was slightly modified for 1967 to promote more complete combustion and reduce exhaust emission toxicity.
 All G engines used forged steel crankshafts until the middle of model year 1976, when a less costly cast-iron crankshaft was introduced. The cast crankshaft uses a different block, different main and connecting rod bearings and different connecting rods.
 The counterbore in the rear flange of the crankshaft was  diameter until 1967. This difference has implications when swapping engines with automatic transmissions.
 All G-engines used solid valve lifters through the 1980 model year, with the exception of a small production test of hydraulic lifters in the 1978 model year. For model year 1981, all North American G-engines received top-fed hydraulic lifters. Retrofitment in both directions is possible.
 Emission control devices and systems, carburetor make and specification, and engine assembly details changed over the years to comply with market requirements and preferences.
 Electronic ignition, which had been made available on V8 engines late in 1971, was made standard equipment on all engines including the RG in 1973.
 Induction-hardened exhaust valve seats and upgraded exhaust valves were made standard in 1973 to withstand prolonged operation on no-lead fuel.

Configuration variants

170
The 170 engine was offered in model years 1960 through 1969 in North America, and through 1971 for export markets. The first vehicle to offer the 170 slant-6 was the 1960 Valiant. The "LG" low-deck block was unique to the 170 engine.

198
The 198 was introduced in the North American market for model year 1970 as a more powerful base-model engine than the previous 170 engine. Manufacturing costs were reduced by eliminating using two different blocks for the two different available sizes of slant-6 engine. The 198 engine was available through the 1974 model year.

225

This undersquare geometry was a departure from the emerging trend towards oversquare engines. It provided strong low-rpm torque characteristics for automobiles and trucks, as well as other commercial and marine applications. The 225 was originally designed and introduced in 1960 for use in full-size models, and it eventually became the best known of the Slant Six engines.

In 1982, Chrysler signed an agreement with Perkins Engines to build a dieselized version of the 3.7, with seven main bearings and turbocharged as well as naturally aspirated (and also of the 2.2-liter inline-four) in Windsor, Ontario. Design work had started in 1975, but with the collapse of the diesel market in North America, these plans were cancelled in 1983.

Aluminum block 225
Between late model year 1961 and early model year 1963, approximately 52,000 die-cast aluminum RG blocks were produced and installed in passenger cars. These open-deck blocks used integrally cast high-nickel iron cylinder liners, and bolt-in iron upper and lower main bearing caps. Internal components (crank, rods, pistons, etc.) were the same as used in the iron engine, and an iron cylinder head was used with a special copper-asbestos gasket. The aluminum block weighs about  less than the iron RG block.

Although serviceable examples can still be found, the aluminum RG tended to undergo delamination between the iron cylinder liner and the surrounding aluminum. Severe corrosion within the block is also commonly found because of the general tendency in the 1960s and 1970s to fill cooling systems in summer with plain water without corrosion inhibitors. Moreover, the open-deck design and primitive head gasket technology are not sufficiently robust to withstand the increased seal demands of increased compression or forced induction.

High-performance variants
Most G-engines were equipped with small-capacity carburetors (such as the ubiquitous Holley 1920) and exhaust systems adequate for standard passenger car usage at low altitudes, but which tended to hamper maximum available performance at high altitudes, in heavy or race-purpose vehicles and/or where quicker acceleration was desired. To meet the demand for improved responsiveness, modified engine configurations were made available in various markets over the years.

Hyper Pak

The Hyper Pak was a parts package made available from 1960 through 1962 at Chrysler Corporation dealer parts counters. The parts were made available to comply with the regulations of sanctioning bodies for racing events in which Valiants had been entered by factory-backed teams: All parts used had to be "stock" parts, the definition of which meant that they were available through normal factory parts channels. The Hyper Pak consisted of a very-long-ram intake manifold meant to accept an AFB 4-barrel Carter Carburetor, the AFB carburetor itself and an appropriate air cleaner, dual (front-3 and rear-3) cast-iron exhaust headers, a large-diameter exhaust Y-pipe to connect to these dual cast-iron headers, a larger muffler, a 276°-duration camshaft with appropriate valve springs and pushrods, a heavier-duty clutch, a manual choke control, a starter motor modification template and, in the full-race version of the package, high-compression pistons designed to increase the engine's compression ratio to 10.5 from the stock 8.5. The Hyper Pak was recommended for installation only on vehicles equipped with manual transmissions, for the camshaft was of such characteristics that a high idle speed was required to prevent engine stall-out. The Hyper Pak was primarily intended for competition driving, its road manners involving rough idling and poor cold-engine driveability, a high power band and poor fuel economy. In competition events it proved unbeatable. Seven factory-backed Valiants entered the 1960 NASCAR compact car race at Daytona Beach, and humbled the competition. The Valiants came in first through seventh. A high-fidelity reproduction of the Hyper Pak intake manifold was created by Slant-6 builder Doug Dutra in the late 1990s. Subsequently the tooling was sold to a marketer of performance equipment (Clifford Research, 6=8) for inline six-cylinder engines.

Multiple carburetors
For the 1965–1968 model years, Chrysler Argentina equipped Valiant GT models with a system of dual 1-barrel Holley RX 7000 A carburetors and other engine specification changes.

2-barrel carburetion

Export 2-barrel setup

For the 1967 model year, a 2-barrel carburetor setup was released for export production. This configuration, similar to that found on marine G-engines beginning in 1965, consisted of an iron intake manifold with open-plenum 2-barrel carburetor mounting pad, a Carter BBD carburetor, and associated air cleaner, linkage and plumbing changes. Also installed on these export 2-barrel engines was a slightly hotter camshaft (244° duration rather than 240°), and a distributor with modified advance curves. Driveability characteristics were generally superior to those of the 1-barrel engine, but to avoid cutting into sales of the more expensive V8 engine, this 2-barrel setup was not offered in the North American market. Of particular note is the automatic choke design found in this export 2-barrel setup. Most Chrysler products used remote automatic chokes, with a bimetal coil spring mounted on the exhaust manifold, exposed to exhaust heat and operating a pushrod which rotated the choke lever on the carburetor. The export 2-barrel setup used an integral heat-tube style automatic choke: Air heated by the exhaust manifold was routed to a round bakelite housing on the carburetor air horn, which contained a bimetal spring acting directly on the choke lever.

Super Six
By the mid-1970s in the North American market, emission control regulations were reducing engine performance at the same time as safety regulations were making cars heavier. An increase in performance was required for the G-engine, so a 2-barrel setup was released for the 1976 model year. This was not the same as the export 2-barrel package; the intake manifold used a throttle-bored plenum rather than an open one, and had provisions for an EGR valve. The carburetor, a Carter BBD similar but not identical to the one used on Chrysler's  V8 engine, used a standard Chrysler-style remote automatic choke. A  exhaust headpipe was also provided, as well as 2-barrel-specific advance curves in the ignition distributor.

Applications

Passenger cars, trucks, vans

 1980-1983 Chrysler Cordoba
 1982-1984 Chrysler Fifth Avenue
 1977-1981 Chrysler LeBaron
 1962-1970 Chrysler Valiant
 1975-1980 Dodge Aspen
 1970-1971 Dodge Challenger
 1969-1974 Dodge Charger
 1965-1976 Dodge Coronet
 1959-1976 Dodge Dart
 1971-1972 Dodge Demon
 1971-1988 Dodge Ram Van
 1977-1983 Dodge Diplomat
 1960-1962 Dodge Lancer
 1980-1983 Dodge Mirada
 1965-1967 Dodge Monaco (Canada)
 1977-1978 Dodge Monaco
 1969-1973 Dodge Polara
 1981-1987 Dodge Ram
 1978-1981 Dodge St. Regis
 1964-1970 A-series truck and van
 1960-1987 D-series truck and van
 1961-1987 W-series 4WD truck
 1964-1971 Plymouth Barracuda
 1962-1967 Plymouth Belvedere
 1969-1976 Plymouth Duster
 1960-1973;1975-1978 Plymouth Fury
 1980-1984 Plymouth Gran Fury
 1971-1974 Plymouth Satellite
 1955-1956;1962-1964 Plymouth Savoy
 1960-1976 Plymouth Valiant
 1975-1980 Plymouth Volaré

References

External links

 Newsreel: Valiant wins 1960 Compact Car race at Daytona Beach

Slant 6
Straight-six engines
Slant engines
Gasoline engines by model